Hiranmayee Mishra (born June 2, 1968) is a novelist and poet from Bhubaneswar, Odisha, India.

Life 
Mishra was born to novelist Madan Mohan Mishra and Anusaya Mishra. She is an alumnus of Utkal University. Mishra teaches political science and English literature at the Udayanath Autonomous College of Science & Technology, Adaspur, Cuttack. She is a novelist and poet and also the director of Centre for Women’s Studies.

Books 
Her literary works include:

 Gotie Barsaratira Kahani
 Prathama
 Kinnarira Kabya
 Nila Rangara Nisha
 Basnayita Rati
 Kete Dure Mora Priya Desha (travelogue)
 Bibhorbela (poetry)
 Megha Pakhira Geeta

She has written an essay titled, Negotiating privately for an effective role in public space: A case study of women in panchayats of Orissa (2013).

Recognition 
In 2018, she was awarded the Kanhei Katha Puraskar honour for her contribution to Odia fiction. Previously, she has been awarded with the Bhubaneswar Pustak Mela Fiction Award, Katha Nabaprativa Award, Bharatiya Bhasa Parishad Youth Award, Kadambini Best Fiction Award, Bhubaneswar Behera State Fiction Award, Time Pass Booker Award and others.

References 

1978 births
Living people
Indian women novelists
Indian women poets
Writers from Bhubaneswar
Utkal University alumni
Indian women academics